Baisogala is a small town in Lithuania. It is situated on the crossroads of Kėdainiai–Šeduva and Raseiniai–Šeduva roads. According to the 2011 census, it had 2,034 residents.

History

Baisogala is first mentioned in written sources in 1539 when King Sigismund I the Old established a parish with seat in the town. Archeologists discovered cemeteries from the 5th and 6th centuries near the town suggesting the people inhabited the area well before the 16th century. In the 17th century, the town was granted to the Radvila family and changed hands a few times. In 1791 the town was granted city privileges according to the Magdeburg law. Eventually, the town was bought in 1830 by Joseph Komar, a former colonel of Napoleon Bonaparte. The Komar family remained in Baisogala until 1940 when the Soviets arrested and deported the family to Kazakhstan.

Religion
The first church was built by King Sigismund II Augustus, but it did not survive. The church in the present location was built in 1781 and rebuilt in 1882 with financial support from the Komar family.

Notable people from Baisogala 

Nachum Kaplan
Arvydas Každailis
Alfredas Kulpa-Kulpavičius
Estanislao Shilinsky Bachanska

References

Towns in Lithuania
Towns in Šiauliai County
Shavelsky Uyezd